Spasoje Stefanović (born 12 October 1992) is a Serbian footballer who plays for Radnički Sremska Mitrovica.

Club career
After failing to make an appearance for Serbian second division sides FK BSK Borča as well as FK Teleoptik, Stefanović played college soccer for the University of South Florida.

For the second half of 2017–18, he signed for FK Skopje in Macedonia.

For 2019, he signed for Finnish second division club AC Kajaani.

In 2019, Stefanović returned to Serbia with FK Sinđelić Beograd.

On 5 September 2020, Stefanović signed for Ararat Yerevan from Sinđelić Beograd. On 15 January 2021, Stefanović left Ararat Yerevan, signing for Shirak on 16 January 2021.

International career
He was selected for Serbia's squad for the 2011 UEFA European Under-19 Championship, but remained a back-up to Nikola Perić in all games.

References

External links
 

1992 births
Sportspeople from Pristina
Living people
Serbian footballers
Association football goalkeepers
FK BSK Borča players
FK Teleoptik players
FK Beograd players
FK Radnički Obrenovac players
FK BASK players
South Florida Bulls men's soccer players
FK Radnički 1923 players
FK Skopje players
FK Sileks players
AC Kajaani players
FK Sinđelić Beograd players
FC Ararat Yerevan players
FC Shirak players
Serbian First League players
Macedonian First Football League players
Ykkönen players
Armenian Premier League players
Serbian expatriate footballers
Expatriate soccer players in the United States
Serbian expatriate sportspeople in the United States
Expatriate footballers in North Macedonia
Serbian expatriate sportspeople in North Macedonia
Expatriate footballers in Finland
Serbian expatriate sportspeople in Finland
Expatriate footballers in Armenia
Serbian expatriate sportspeople in Armenia